Aim 4 More (AIM is for Aboriginal and Islander Mob) was an Indigenous Australian band. They released their debut self-titled CD in 1997. They won a Deadly in 1997 for Most Promising New Talent. They were features in the ABC TV show Defining Black.

Discography
 AIM 4 More (1997) - Jamalga Music

References

Musical groups established in 1993
Musical groups disestablished in 1997
Musical groups from Brisbane
Indigenous Australian musical groups